The 2007 St Helens Metropolitan Borough Council election took place on 3 May 2007 to elect members of St Helens Metropolitan Borough Council in Merseyside, England. One third of the council was up for election and the council stayed under no overall control.

After the election, the composition of the council was
Labour 21
Liberal Democrats 20
Conservative 6
Independent 1

Background
After the last election in 2006, Labour were the largest party with 23 councillors, compared to 19 for the Liberal Democrats and 6 for the Conservatives. However following the election the Liberal Democrats and Conservatives reached an agreement to run the council together. In June 2006 2 Labour councillors, Bessie Griffin and Pat Robinson, left the party to sit as independent councillors, with Pat Robinson going on to join the Liberal Democrats early in 2007. This meant that before the 2007 election Labour had 21 seats, the Liberal Democrats had 19, the Conservatives 6, there was 1 independent and 1 seat was vacant, after the retirement of Liberal Democrat councillor Julie Jones.

17 seats were contested at the election, including 2 seats in Sutton, with both Labour and the Liberal Democrats defending 7, the Conservatives defended 2 seats, and 1 former Liberal Democrat seat was vacant. Key seats were expected before the election to be in Bold, Haydock, Town Centre and West Park wards. Candidates at the election included four from the British National Party, up from one in 2006, while a former Labour leader of the council in the 1980s, Brian Green, stood for the Community Action Party in Bold.

Election result
The Labour and Liberal Democrat parties both gained 2 seats from each other to leave the party balance on the council unchanged. Labour gained seats from the Liberal Democrats in Thatto Heath and West Park to leave Labour on 21 seats, with the winner in West Park, Marlene Quinn, being the sister of the Labour group leader Marie Rimmer. However the Liberal Democrats took seats in Haydock and Town Centre from Labour to leave them just one seat behind Labour with 20 councillors. Meanwhile, the Conservatives held the 2 seats they had been defending to remain with 6 seats and the only independent councillor was not defending their seat in 2007.

Following the election the independent councillor Bessie Griffin joined the Liberal Democrats, which meant both the Labour and Liberal Democrat groups had 21 seats. The Liberal Democrats and Conservatives continued to run the council, after agreeing to renew their pact.

Ward results

References

2007 English local elections
2007
2000s in Merseyside